Melinda Kistétényi (25 July 1926 – 20 October 1999) was a Hungarian classical organist and composer known for improvisations. She was born in Hungary and worked as a professor of music at the Franz Liszt Academy of Music of Budapest for 53 years. Her students include Andras Schiff, Zoltán Kocsis, Ivan Fischer, Dezső Ránki, Sylvia Sass, Xaver Varnus and Veronika Kincses. She died in Budapest.

Works
Selected works include:
Gyászének (with Zoltán Kodály)
Sonata for Solo Trombone
Plaisirs, doux vainqueurs
A csábító
Már nem hívlak, kérlek
Csöndesedj, vígaszt nyerj
Hiába várod
I call you all to Woden's hall
Piu non cerca libertá

Kistétényi's works have been recorded and issued on CD, including:
Contemporary Works with Trombone Label: Hungaraoton

Film appearances:
Zenés TV színház (TV series) – Egy szerelem három éjszakája (1986) (musician: organ)

References

External links

1926 births
1999 deaths
Hungarian classical organists
20th-century classical composers
Hungarian classical composers
Women classical composers
Women organists
20th-century organists
20th-century women composers